Numerous actions have been termed the Battle of Brest, Brest being the name of two important fortress towns in France and Belarus, respectively, and a small town in Croatia.

Brest, Croatia 
The Battle of Brest (1592), part of the Hundred Years' Croatian–Ottoman War
The Battle of Brest (1596), part of the Hundred Years' Croatian–Ottoman War and the Long War (1591–1606)

Brest, France 
The Battle of Brest (1342) - a naval battle off the port during the Hundred Years' War.
The Siege of Brest (1386) - a siege of the Hundred Years' War.
The Battle of Saint-Mathieu - a naval battle off the port during the War of the League of Cambrai in 1512, often called the battle of Brest.
The Attack on Brest - a failed attack in 1694 by the English to destroy the harbor of Brest during the War of the Grand Alliance
Various naval actions of the eighteenth century, including those sometimes termed the First, Second or Third Battles of Ushant are occasionally termed the battle of Brest.
The Battle for Brest - A land battle between American and German forces over possession of the strategic port in 1944.

Brest, Belarus
The Battle of Brest (1655) during the Russo-Polish War (1654–67)
The Battle of Brest (1794), also known as the Battle of Terespol, during the Kosciuszko Uprising.
The Battle of Brześć Litewski also called the Battle of Brest-Litovsk was an action between the Poles and the Germans in September 1939.
The Battle of Brest (1941) or Defense of Brest Fortress took place on 22 June - 30 June 1941
In July 1944 the town was taken by the Soviets during the Lublin–Brest Offensive.